Mohammad Baitullah (2 February 1927 – 9 March 1987) was a Bangladesh Awami League politician and the former deputy Speaker of Parliament.

Early life
He was born on 2 February 1927 at Shalebaj, Naogaon. In 1943 he graduated from Paharpur High School. he finished undergraduate studies in  Rajshahi Government College in 1947. He went to graduate school and law school in Dhaka University.

Career
He served from 1952 to 1953 as the headmaster of Kirtipur High School. He was the headmaster of Chawk Atiqua High School from 1953 to 1954. He joined Naogaon Bashiruddin Memorial College as the Professor of Political Science after that. From 1957 he started his law career at the Naogaon subdivisional court.

He was active in the language movement of 1948. He was elected president of Naogaon unit of Awami League in 1969. The same year he was elected vice president of Rajshahi district unit of Awami League. He was elected the Pakistan National Assembly in 1970. He served as chief of Bangalipur youth camp during Bangladesh Liberation war. He was elected deputy speaker of the Parliament on 12 November 1972, after the independence of Bangladesh and again in 1973. In 1986 he was elected to the parliament for the last time.

Death
He died on  9 March 1987. Mohammad Mahbubuzzaman was elected from his constituency after a by-election following Baitullah's death.

References

Awami League politicians
1927 births
Deputy Speakers of the Jatiya Sangsad
1987 deaths
3rd Jatiya Sangsad members
People from Naogaon District
Bangladesh Krishak Sramik Awami League central committee members